Akbar Torkan (1952–2021) was an Iranian mechanical engineer and politician, who was the President Hassan Rouhani's chief adviser from 2013 to 2018. He served as the CEO of Iran's Construction Engineering Organization from 2014 to 2017. He was also the Minister of Defense and Minister of Roads and Transportation in the government headed by President Akbar Hashemi Rafsanjani.

Career and political stance
Torkan graduated from Sharif University of Technology. He was governor of Hormozgan, and Ilam provinces after the revolution in 1979. Even though he was a civilian, he served as the head of the Defense Industries Organization during wartime. After the war he supported president Rafsanjani in his election.

He was appointed Minister of Defense in 1989 by Rafsanjani in his cabinet in his first term. He was approved by the Majlis with a majority vote, 242 for and 10 against. In second term of Rafsanjani's presidency, Torkan was appointed Minister of Roads and Transportation.

According to the Tehran Times, Torkan was one of the "trusted members of Rohani’s inner circle." The same source said that Torkan was known for his liberal views on a market economy, and that he served as the deputy director of Rouhani's presidential campaign.

References

External links

Anthony H. Cordesman, Iran's military forces in transition

1952 births
2021 deaths
Sharif University of Technology alumni
Defence ministers of Iran
20th-century Iranian engineers
Executives of Construction Party politicians
Moderation and Development Party politicians
Presidential advisers of Iran
Politicians from Tehran
Iranian mechanical engineers